Løding is a village in the municipality of Bodø in Nordland county, Norway. The village is mostly referred to as Tverlandet,  which also encompasses the areas Hopen, Vatne, Heggmoen, Mjønes, Vågan, Holand, Skålbunes, Elstad, Oddan, Allmenningen, Godøynes (Gaunes), and Naurstad, all of which lies around the village.

The village lies at the northern terminus of Norwegian County Road 17 and along the Nordland Line railway.  The Tverlandet Church is located in Løding, and the local sports club is Tverlandet IL. In the centre of the village, there is a doctor's office, dentist office, and grocery stores, along with the country's first Nikita hair salon. There is a pizza restaurant, building material store and a specialist store within caravan and equipment. Within the village there is a retirement home, several kindergartens, and school up and until the Ungdomsskole, which are divided between the Løding skole (grades 1-4) and the Tverlandet Skole (grades 5-10).

The lake Vatnvatnet lies north of the village.

Notable residents
 Tore Johansen (b. 1977), a jazz artist. 
 Marie Blokhus (b. 1982), an actress.

References

Bodø
Villages in Nordland
Populated places of Arctic Norway